Parartemia contracta is a species of fairy shrimp in the family Parartemiidae and is commonly found in Australia.

In IUCN terms, the conservation status of Parartemia contracta is "VU" (vulnerable). Meaning that the species faces a high risk of endangerment in the medium term.

References

Further reading

 

Anostraca
Articles created by Qbugbot
Crustaceans described in 1941